The Gods Awaken may refer to:

The Gods Awaken (book), a mythology book by Allan Cole
The Gods Awaken (album), a 2001 album by Bjørn Lynne based on the book